162nd meridian may refer to:

162nd meridian east, a line of longitude east of the Greenwich Meridian
162nd meridian west, a line of longitude west of the Greenwich Meridian